The City of Kwinana is a local government area of Western Australia. It covers an area of approximately 118 square kilometres in metropolitan Perth, and lies about 38 km south of Perth central business district, via the Kwinana Freeway. Kwinana maintains 287 km of roads and had a population of almost 39,000 as at the 2016 Census.

History 

Kwinana is a Kimberley Aboriginal word meaning either "young woman" or "pretty maiden". The ship  was wrecked on Cockburn Sound in 1922 and blown onto Kwinana Beach. The nearby area acquired the name and it was officially adopted for a township in 1937. Some of its suburbs take their names from the sailing ships that first brought immigrants to Western Australia, for example, Medina, Calista and Parmelia.

The Kwinana Road District was formed out of part of Rockingham on 15 February 1954 as a result of the passage of the Kwinana Road District Act 1953. Section 4 of the Act stated that "there shall not be a duly elected Road Board for the Kwinana Road District but the Governor may, by Order in Council, appoint a fit and proper person having a comprehensive knowledge and experience of local government matters to be Commissioner of the district."

On 11 November 1960, an Order in Council was issued dividing Kwinana into five wards in preparation for an election to be held on 11 February 1961. The Town ward would elect 3 councillors while the Rural, Industrial, Naval Base and Kwinana Beach wards would each elect one councillor. In order that the election could go ahead, the Kwinana Road District Act was repealed on 14 February 1961 by proclamation, with the District now subject to the same laws as any other council. The first elected councillors took office on 15 February 1961.

On 1 July 1961, the district became the Shire of Kwinana following the enactment of the Local Government Act 1960. It became the Town of Kwinana on 28 May 1977 and it assumed its current name when it was proclaimed a city on 17 September 2012.

Industry 

In 1952 a major industrial area was developed by BP (then the Anglo-Iranian Oil Company) in conjunction with the state government. The state government guaranteed that it would provide electricity, water, essential infrastructure and 2000 state homes within three years to support the establishment of the Kwinana Oil Refinery. Today there are many other associated petro-chemical companies nearby.

The city is home to the Fremantle Outer Harbour consisting of, from north to south, the Alcoa Jetty, the Kwinana Bulk Terminal, the BP Oil Refinery Jetty, the Kwinana Bulk Jetty and the CBH Grain Jetty.

Of these, the Kwinana Bulk Terminal and the Kwinana Bulk Jetty are operated by the Fremantle Ports and serve for the import and export of bulk cargoes and liquids, among them iron ore, coal, cement clink, gypsum, liquefied natural gas, petroleum and fertiliser. The other three facilities are privately operated.

The Outer Harbour deepwater bulk facilities in at Kwinana were first developed in 1955, to service the Kwinana industrial area, and saw rapid expansion in the 1960s and 70s.

From 1968 to 1982, the BHP subsidiary company, Australian Iron & Steel, operated a blast furnace making pig iron at Kwinana, using iron ore mined at Koolyanobing.

The Kwinana Industrial Area is also home to the Kwinana Grain Terminal, also the facility is located in East Rockingham. A cooperative owned by 12,000 farmers, CBH Group is Western Australia's leading grain storage, handling and marketing business. Grain from the facility is also used to supply Primary Energy's proposed bio-fuel facility in Kwinana.

In 2020, Spanish renewable energy leader Acciona and Hitachi Zosen Inova (HZI) received the green light to build a waste-to-energy plant in the Rockingham Industrial Zone. The 29 MW plant will have capacity to power 40,000 homes from an annual feedstock of 300,000 tonnes of municipal, industrial and commercial rubbish.

Facilities 

There are three public beaches at Cockburn Sound looking out to Garden Island. The SS Kwinana herself is actually part of the former jetty at Kwinana Beach. The rusting hulk of the ship was cut down to low water level and the centre was filled with limestone to form a platform. There are also wetlands and bushlands in the Kwinana area. The Spectacles are the local wetlands and are so named because of their appearance from the air.

The local companies are keen to be seen preserving the environment and claim to demonstrate the best practice in production methods and environmental safeguards. The BP Kwinana Refinery is apparently responsible for 'Australia's cleanest petrol' – BP Ultimate, which matches the stringent environmental specifications demanded in Europe and the United States.

Kwinana also is home to a centre of attraction for Drag Racing, Dirt Track Speedway, Burnout Competitions, Street Machine shows and Super Cross events. The Perth Motorplex (formerly known as Quit Motorplex) opened in December 2000 at a cost of A$20 million with catering, licensed bars, state of the art stadium lighting and the "Snake Pit", a purpose built and dedicated burn out section. The venue holds many prestigious events including the Westernationals (drag racing), World Series Sprintcars (speedway) and Motorvation (car show).

Mayors

Suburbs

The suburbs of the City of Kwinana with population and size figures based on the most recent Australian census:

Population

Heritage-listed places

As of 2021, 85 places are heritage-listed in the City of Kwinana, of which three are on the State Register of Heritage Places, the Kwinana Signal Box, Peel Town Archaeological Sites and Mead Homestead.

See also 
 Kwinana Desalination Plant
 Gilmore College

References

External links 

 
 Map of Industrial Area (pdf – 1.8Mb)

 
Kwinana